In Greek mythology, Phorbas (Ancient Greek: Φόρβας, gen. Φόρβαντος) or Phorbaceus was the sixth king of Argos.

Family 
Phorbas was given two different parentage and progeny by various sources. According to scholia on Euripides, his parents were Criasus and Melantho (Melantomice), brother of Ereuthalion and Cleoboea and father of Arestor and Triopas by Euboea. While Pausanias stated that Phorbas was the son of Argus, brother of Peirasus and possibly Tiryns and Epidaurus as they were sons of Argus. His mother in the latter case maybe Evadne, daughter of river god Strymon. In which case, both authors agree that he had a son Triopas who also became a king after him. Another son, Pellen (Pelles) was credited to be the founder of the city of Pellene in Achaea.

Reign 
According to Tatiānus, he may have been a king of Argos himself, succeeding either Argus or Criasus. Eusebius included him in the list of kings of Argos, in which he reigned for thirty five years and was succeeded by Triopas. He was a contemporary of Actaeus, the first king of Attica who named the country after himself, Actaea. During Phorbas' reign, Cecrops Diphyes became the first king of the Athenians.

Notes

References 
 Apollonius Rhodius, Argonautica translated by Robert Cooper Seaton (1853-1915), R. C. Loeb Classical Library Volume 001. London, William Heinemann Ltd, 1912. Online version at the Topos Text Project.
Apollonius Rhodius, Argonautica. George W. Mooney. London. Longmans, Green. 1912. Greek text available at the Perseus Digital Library.
Pausanias, Description of Greece with an English Translation by W.H.S. Jones, Litt.D., and H.A. Ormerod, M.A., in 4 Volumes. Cambridge, MA, Harvard University Press; London, William Heinemann Ltd. 1918. . Online version at the Perseus Digital Library
Pausanias, Graeciae Descriptio. 3 vols. Leipzig, Teubner. 1903.  Greek text available at the Perseus Digital Library.
William Smith. A Dictionary of Greek and Roman biography and mythology s.v. Phorbas

Princes in Greek mythology
Kings of Argos
Inachids
Mythology of Argos